Mogas 90 Football Club is a football club of Benin, playing in the city of Porto-Novo. They currently play in the Benin Premier League.

Achievements
Benin Premier League: 3
1996, 1997, 2006
Benin Cup: 10
1991, 1992, 1994, 1995, 1998, 1999, 2000, 2003, 2004, 2012

Performance in CAF competitions
CAF Champions League: 3 appearances
1997 – Preliminary Round
1998 – First Round
2007 – Preliminary Round

CAF Confederation Cup: 2 appearances
2004 – Preliminary Round
2005 – Preliminary Round

CAF Cup: 2 appearances
1994 – disqualified in First Round
1995 – First Round

CAF Cup Winners' Cup: 4 appearances
1992 – Quarter-finals
1996 – First Round
1999 – Preliminary Round
2000 – First Round

External links
Team profile – soccerway.com

Football clubs in Benin